Dəmirçilər is a village in the Qubadli District of Azerbaijan. It's located between the two rivers of Bargushad and Aghachay.

History 
The origin of this village's name comes from Turkish tribes which subsisted in this region over a period of history.

It was captured by Armenian troops in August 1993 during First Nagorno-Karabakh War and was renamed Yerkatavork. It was subsequently made part of the Kashatagh Province of self-proclaimed Republic of Artsakh. It was captured by Azerbaijan Army on 7 November 2020 during the Lachin offensive.

Gallery

References

External links 

Populated places in Qubadli District